Sanjay Ghodawat University is a State Private University established under Government of Maharashtra Act No. XL of 2017, with the approval of the UGC. It is located in  Kolhapur.

References

External links

Universities in Maharashtra
Education in Kolhapur
Educational institutions established in 2017
2017 establishments in Maharashtra